A passenger car is an automobile as opposed to a truck.

Passenger car may also refer to:
 Passenger car (Ferris wheel), a compartment for carrying passengers
 Passenger car (rail), railway rolling stock for carrying passengers

See also

 Car (disambiguation)
 Sedan (disambiguation)
 Voiture (disambiguation)
 Automobile (disambiguation)